The Yunnan–Guangdong HVDC is a high-voltage direct current transmission system connecting Chuxiong in the Yunnan to Suidong, Zengcheng in Guangdong, China. It is the first HVDC link in the world operating at a transmission voltage of 800 kV.   The transmission line is operated by China Southern Power Grid.  In 2007, the order to supply the system was awarded to Siemens Energy.  The first pole was put into operation in December 2009 with the second pole to follow in June 2010.

It transmits electricity from the hydropower plants in the Yunnan to the Guangdong, including cities of Guangzhou and Shenzhen.

Yunnan–Guangdong HVDC shares the grounding electrode together with HVDC Guizhou - Guangdong II at Linwu ( coordinates: 
23°44′48″ N 113°17′09″E ).

See also

 Southern Hami–Zhengzhou UHVDC

References

Energy infrastructure completed in 2010
Electric power infrastructure in China
HVDC transmission lines
2010 establishments in China